Helicometra is a genus of trematodes in the class Opecoelidae. It is synonymous with Allostenopera Baeva, 1968, Metahelicometra Yamaguti, 1971, and Stenopera Manter, 1933. Its type species is H. fasciata (Rudolphi, 1819). They are distinguished by their unique spiral uterus, from which their name is derived.

Species
Helicometra aegyptensis Hassanine, 2007
Helicometra antarcticae Holloway & Bier, 1968
Helicometra aposinuata Pritchard, 1966
Helicometra bassensis Woolcock, 1935
Helicometra borneoensis Fischthal & Kuntz, 1965
Helicometra boseli Nagaty, 1956
Helicometra dalianensis (Li, Qiu & Zhang, 1989)
Helicometra dorabi (Mamaev & Oshmarin, 1966)
Helicometra equilata (Manter, 1933)
Helicometra fasciata (Rudolphi, 1819)
Helicometra filamentosa Madhavi, 1975
Helicometra fusiformis Wang, Wang & Zhang, 1992
Helicometra gibsoni Meenakshi, Madhavi & Swarnkumari, 1993
Helicometra gomphosi Yamaguti, 1970
Helicometra grandora Manter, 1954
Helicometra hapalogenyos Wang, Wang & Zhang, 1992
Helicometra indica Agrawal, 1964
Helicometra insolita Polyanski, 1955
Helicometra interrupta Hassanine, 2005
Helicometra kyliotrema Pritchard, 1966
Helicometra manteri Andres, Ray, Pulis, Curran & Overstreet, 2014
Helicometra nasae Nagaty & Abdel-Aal, 1962
Helicometra neoscorpaenae Wang, Wang & Zhang, 1992
Helicometra overstreeti Blend & Dronen, 2015
Helicometra pisanoae Zdzitowiecki, 1998
Helicometra pisodonophi Há, 2012
Helicometra pleurogrammi (Baeva, 1968)
Helicometra plovmornini Issaitchikov, 1928
Helicometra pteroisi (Gupta, 1956)
Helicometra rakusai Zdzitowiecki, 1997
Helicometra robinsorum Overstreet & Martin, 1974
Helicometra scorpaenae Prudhoe & Bray, 1973
Helicometra sebastis (Sekerak & Arai, 1974)
Helicometra selaroides Shen, 1986
Helicometra sinipercae Wang, 1982
Helicometra sprenti Aken'Ova, Cribb & Bray, 2006
Helicometra tenuifolia Woolcock, 1935
Helicometra torta Linton, 1910

Species later synonymised with species of Helicometra
Helicometra antarcticae Holloway & Bier, 1968
Neohelicometra antarcticae (Holloway & Bier, 1968)
Helicometra boseli Nagaty, 1956
Helicometra rectisaccus (Fischthal & Kuntz, 1964)
Stenopera rectisaccus Fischthal & Kuntz, 1964
Helicometra dalianensis (Li, Qiu & Zhang, 1989)
Neohelicometra dalianensis Li, Qiu & Zhang, 1989
Helicometra dorabi (Mamaev & Oshmarin, 1966)
Stenopera dorabi Mamaev & Oshmarin, 1966
Helicometra equilata (Manter, 1933)
Stenopera equilata Manter, 1933
Helicometra fasciata (Rudolphi, 1819)
Helicometra dochmosorchis Manter & Pritchard, 1960
Helicometra epinepheli Yamaguti, 1934
Helicometra flava Stossich, 1903
Helicometra gobii (Stossich, 1883)
Helicometra hypodytis Yamaguti, 1934
Helicometra labri (Stossich, 1886)
Helicometra markewitschi Pogorel'tseva, 1954
Helicometra marmoratae Nagaty & Abdel-Aal, 1962
Helicometra mutabilis (Stossich, 1902)
Helicometra pulchella (Rudolphi, 1819)
Helicometra scorpaenae Wang, 1982
Helicometra sinuata (Rudolphi, 1819)
Helicometra upapalu Yamaguti, 1970
Helicometra insolita Polyanski, 1955
Neohelicometra insolita (Polyansky, 1955)
Helicometra pisodonophi Nguyen Van Ha, 2012
Hamacreadium gymnomuraenae Shen & Li, 2000
Helicometra pleurogrammi (Baeva, 1968)
Allostenopera pleurogrammi Baeva, 1968
Helicometra pugetensis Schell, 1973
Neohelicometra pleurogrammi (Baeva, 1968)
Helicometra pteroisi (Gupta, 1956)
Stenopera pteroisi Gupta, 1956
Helicometra sebastis (Sekerak & Arai, 1974)
Neohelicometra sebastis Sekerak & Arai, 1974
Helicometra tenuifolia Woolcock, 1935
Helicometra neosebastodis Crowcroft, 1947
Helicometra torta Linton, 1910
Helicometra pretiosa Bravo-Hollis & Manter, 1957

References

Opecoelidae